Disability in Malaysia refers to the people with disability in Malaysia (Malay: Orang Kurang Upaya or OKU). As of 2007, there are 197,519 people in Malaysia with various category of disability. The country is a state party to the United Nations' Convention on the Rights of Persons with Disabilities, having signed on 8 April 2008 and ratified the treaty on 19 July 2010.

Categories 

The Department of Social Welfare Malaysia lists disabilities into seven categories, which are hearing, visual, speaking, physical, learning, mental and multiple disabilities.

Law 

In 2008, the Parliament of Malaysia passed the Persons with Disabilities Act (PWDA) to ensure access for disabled people to public facilities, transportation, recreation, leisure and sport services.

National-level organisations 
 Alzheimer's Disease Foundation of Malaysia
 Kiwanis Disability Information and Support Centre
 Malaysia Information Network for the Disabled
 Malaysian Association for the Blind
 Malaysian Braille Press
 Malaysian Federation of the Deaf
 Malaysian Confederation of the Disabled
 Malaysian Mental Health Association
 Malaysian Mentalink Foundation
 Malaysian Parkinson's Disease Association
 Malaysian Spinal Injury Association
 National Council for the Blind, Malaysia

See also 
 Healthcare in Malaysia

References